Emel Korutürk (1915 – 12 March 2013) was a Turkish painter and a former First Lady of Turkey.

Early years
She was born in 1915 as the fourth child of Salah Cimgöz and his wife Hasmane. During her early childhood her father was exiled by the Allies of World War I to Malta.

After her primary education, she studied in Lycée Notre Dame de Sion Istanbul a prestigious school for girls. Following  her high school years in Lausanne, Switzerland she graduated from Güzel Sanatlar Akademisi which is now Mimar Sinan Fine Arts University in 1936. During her academy years she was congratulated by Mustafa Kemal Atatürk, the first president of Turkey, for her talent in art in 1933. After academy she worked together with Turkish painter İbrahim Çallı.

Family life
In 1944 she married Fahri Korutürk, a naval officer. The couple had two sons and a daughter, Osman, Salah and Ayşe.
Between 1960 and 1977 Fahri Korutürk was the commander of the Turkish Naval Forces.  After his retirement from the navy in 1960, he was appointed as Turkish ambassador to the Soviet Union (1960–1964) and later to Spain (1964–1965). In 1968 Fahri Korutürk was elected as the senate member by the president who had the right to name 15 members of the Turkish senate. In 1973, he was elected as the 6th president of Turkey. Thus Emel Korutürk became the first lady of the country. In 1980 Fahri Korutürk's term as the president ended and in 1987 he died. Emel Korutürk lived another 26 years and died on 13 March 2013 in İstanbul.

Her contributions to art
During her term as the first lady, she concentrated on promoting Turkish painting. She was instrumental in presidential receptions to Turkish artists. She also supported the foundation of the Ankara State Art and Sculpture Museum which would be a model for other such museums. In this museum, she began collecting 34 paintings of Turkish artist Fikret Mualla. Her painting "Gratitude to Gazi" (referring to "Atatürk") is also exhibited in the museum.

References

1915 births
2013 deaths
Artists from Istanbul
Turkish women painters
First Ladies of Turkey
Academy of Fine Arts in Istanbul alumni